A betaine in chemistry is any neutral chemical compound with a positively charged cationic functional group, such as a quaternary ammonium or phosphonium cation (generally: onium ions) that bears no hydrogen atom and with a negatively charged functional group such as a carboxylate group that may not be adjacent to the cationic site.  Historically, the term was reserved for trimethylglycine (TMG) which is involved in methylation reactions and detoxification of homocysteine. This is a modified amino acid consisting of glycine with three methyl groups serving as methyl donor for various metabolic pathways.

The pronunciation of the compound reflects its origin and first isolation from sugar beets (Beta vulgaris subsp. vulgaris), and does not derive from the Greek letter beta (β). It is commonly pronounced beta-INE or  BEE-tayn.

In biological systems, many naturally occurring betaines serve as organic osmolytes. These are substances synthesized or taken up from the environment by cells for protection against osmotic stress, drought, high salinity, or high temperature. Intracellular accumulation of betaines permits water retention in cells, thus protecting from the effects of dehydration. This accumulation is non-perturbing to enzyme function, protein structure, and membrane integrity. Betaine is also a methyl donor of increasingly recognised significance in biology.

Glycine betaine 

The original betaine, N,N,N-trimethylglycine, was named after its discovery in sugar beet (Beta vulgaris subsp. vulgaris) in the nineteenth century. It is a small N-trimethylated amino acid. It is a zwitterion, which cannot isomerize because there is no labile hydrogen atom attached to the nitrogen atom. This substance may be called glycine betaine to distinguish it from other betaines.

Uses

Biochemistry
Phosphonium betaines are intermediates in the Wittig reaction. The addition of betaine to polymerase chain reactions improves the amplification of DNA by reducing the formation of secondary structure in GC-rich regions. The addition of betaine may enhance the specificity of the polymerase chain reaction by eliminating the base pair composition dependence of DNA melting.

Food additive
In 2017, the European Food Safety Authority concluded that betaine was safe "as a novel food to be used at a maximum intake level of 6 mg/kg body weight per day in addition to the intake from the background diet."

Approved drug
A prescription drug (Cystadane) containing betaine has limited use for oral treatment of genetic homocystinuria to lower levels of homocysteine in circulating blood.

Dietary supplement
Trimethylglycine, a betaine, is used as a dietary supplement, although there is no evidence that supplement doses are effective or safe. Common side effects of taking oral betaine include nausea and stomach upset.

Safety concern
Betaine is an irritant of eyes and skin.

See also
Cocamidopropyl betaine
Mesoionic
Mesomeric betaine
Osmoprotectants
Ylide

References

Further reading
 

Quaternary ammonium compounds
Zwitterions
Surfactants